Grafton is a former civil parish, now in the parish of Tilston, in the Cheshire West and Chester district and ceremonial county of Cheshire in England. In 2001 it had a population of 3. The civil parish was abolished in 2015 and merged into Tilston.

References

External links

Former civil parishes in Cheshire
Cheshire West and Chester